Pavel Antonovich Kovalev (born 4 January 1992) is a Russian-French pair skater. With his wife, Camille Kovalev, he is the 2022 Grand Prix de France silver medalist, 2018 Volvo Open Cup silver medalist, 2015 International Cup of Nice bronze medalist, 2015 Lombardia Trophy bronze medalist, and 2022 French national champion.

Personal life 
Kovalev was born on 4 January 1992, in Saint Petersburg, Russia. He married his skating partner, Camille Mendoza, in December 2017.

Career

For Russia 
Kovalev began skating in 1996 in his hometown of Saint Petersburg. As a singles skater, he reached the Younger and Elder Age Russian Junior Championships. Kovalev competed two seasons in pairs with Zoya Rogovtseva beginning in the 2009–10 season and one season with Valeria Morozova in the 2011–12 season. He did not reach the Russian Championships with either partner.

For France 
Kovalev partnered with French pair skater Camille Mendoza to represent France in 2014. Together, they are the 2018 Volvo Open Cup silver medalists, the 2015 International Cup of Nice bronze medalists, the 2015 Lombardia Trophy bronze medalists, and five-time French national medalists, including the 2022 title. After winning the 2022 national title, Kovalev/Kovalev were named to their first European Championships team alongside Coline Keriven / Noël-Antoine Pierre.

Programs 
 With Camille Kovalev

Competitive highlights 
GP: Grand Prix; CS: Challenger Series; JGP: Junior Grand Prix

 With Camille Kovalev

References

External links 
 
 

1992 births
Living people
Russian male pair skaters
French male pair skaters
Figure skaters from Saint Petersburg
Russian emigrants to France